The Dinnawah snowtrout (Schizothorax progastus) is a species of ray-finned fish in the genus Schizothorax from India and Nepal.

References 

Schizothorax
Fish described in 1839